David James (born David Belasco; 1839 – 2 October 1893) was an English comic actor and one of the founders of London's Vaudeville Theatre.

He was born in London to a family of Sephardic Jewish origin. He made his stage debut as a child actor at the Princess's Theatre, London, then managed by Charles Kean. As a young man. he appeared in various burlesques. One of his best roles during that time was as Mercury in Francis Burnand's Ixion, which he performed in its 1863 premiere at the Royalty Theatre.

In 1870 he joined Henry James Montague and Thomas Thorne as the first managers of the newly opened Vaudeville Theatre where his greatest success was as Perkyn Middlewick in Henry James Byron's Our Boys which opened on 16 January 1875 and ran for over 1300 performances. He left the Vaudeville Theatre in 1881 to work at the Haymarket Theatre, followed by a stint at the Lyceum Theatre. In 1886, he became a member of Charles Wyndham's company at the Criterion Theatre.  Shortly before his death in 1893, Our Boys was revived for him.

Unlike Thomas Thorne, his partner at the Vaudeville who died penniless and insane, David James died leaving a fortune of £41,000 (an enormous sum in those days), which went to his synagogue and other Jewish charities. His son was an actor who also performed under the name David James.

References

English male stage actors
English male musical theatre actors
English theatre managers and producers
1839 births
1893 deaths
19th-century English male actors
19th-century British male singers
19th-century British Jews
Jewish British male actors
19th-century English businesspeople